Belforest is a small, unincorporated community in Baldwin County, Alabama, United States.

History
The community name likely comes from a combination of the French word bel, meaning "beautiful," and forest. A post office operated under the name Belforest from 1900 to 1911.

References

Unincorporated communities in Baldwin County, Alabama
Unincorporated communities in Alabama
Populated coastal places in Alabama